Rules Beach is a coastal town and a locality in the Gladstone Region, Queensland, Australia.

Geography 
The southern boundary of the locality is Baffle Creek as it enters the Coral Sea. The land to the north of Baffle Creek as it enters the sea is the Mouth of Baffle Creek Conservation Park. The town itself is a single street of houses by the ocean.

History 
The locality was named and bounded on 9 April 1999.

References 

Towns in Queensland
Gladstone Region
Coastline of Queensland
Localities in Queensland